Hammerfest is a Norwegian municipality.

Hammerfest may also refer to:

Other places in Norway
 Hammerfest (town), the main town in Hammerfest municipality
 Hammerfest Airport, the town's aerodrome
 Hammerfest Church, the town's main place of worship
 Hammerfest prosti, an ecclesiastical region of the Church of Norway
 Kapp Hammerfest, a headland on Svenskøya, Svalbard

Other uses
 Hammerfest (festival), an annual music festival in north Wales, UK
 Hammerfest FK, an association football team based in the Norwegian town
 The Caverns of Hammerfest, a browser-based video game by Motion-Twin
 Hammerfest L1, a fictional space outpost in A Deepness in the Sky by Vernor Vinge